The Bindunuwewa Massacre or Bindunuwewa Prison Massacre took place on October 24, 2000, at a detention center of Bindunuwewa, Sri Lanka, resulting in the deaths of 26 minority Tamil political prisoners by a mob of Sinhalese.

Camp
The low-security detention center was established to house former LTTE cadres. Of the 26 killed, 2 were under the age of 21 and the rest were between 21 and 30.

The massacre
On October 24, 2000, a mob of a few hundred villagers armed with knives, rods and torches stormed the detention center. The Sri Lankan Army detachment that was posted there had been withdrawn the previous day, for unknown reasons.

Once the massacre started, the posted police personnel refused to intervene to stop it.

Government response
Initially, the government responded by saying that the detainees had rioted and that the massacre was an outcome of an attempt to control the rioting. Then it was claimed that the police were unable to protect the detainees in the face of superior mob force. Eventually, the government charged a few police officers with a crime.  Most were initially convicted of murder, only to be released by the Sri Lankan Supreme Court in 2005.

Theories
A number of theories have been postulated to explain the massacre:
 It was organized by local Sinhala nationalist political activists with the connivance of Sri Lankan Army and police personnel.
 It was a reaction by the local villagers who resented the detention center in their neighborhood.
 It was organized by the military establishment to thwart an attempt by the detainees to go on hunger strike in the subsequent days to protest their detention.

See also
 List of attacks attributed to Sri Lankan government forces
 List of attacks attributed to the LTTE
 List of massacres in Sri Lanka

References
Report of Sri Lankan Human Rights commission

Riots and civil disorder in Sri Lanka
2000 in Sri Lanka
Bindunuwewa
Prison massacres in Sri Lanka
Sri Lanka and state terrorism
October 2000 events in Asia